is a Japanese professional footballer who plays as a midfielder for Women's Super League club Liverpool and the Japan women's national team. 

Nagano begun her senior career with Urawa Reds in 2014. She joined WK league club Hyundai Steel Red Angels in 2018. She then returned to Japan and play for Division 2 side Chifure AS Elfen Saitama before joining Mynavi Sendai for the inaugural WE League season. In 2022, she went overseas to join NWSL club North Carolina Courage during the midseason. At the end of the season, she left the club to join Liverpool in the Women's Super League.

Nagano had represented Japan at every youth level and had won both the FIFA U-17 Women's World Cup and FIFA U-20 Women's World Cup with her country. In 2017, she was named Asian Young Footballer of the Year at the AFC Annual Awards.  In 2018, she made her senior international debut for Japan in a friendly match. She has since represented Japan in the AFC Women's Asian Cup and the EAFF E-1 Football Championship.

Club career

Urawa Reds
In 2014, Nagano played for Urawa Reds in Japan's top-division Nadeshiko League and helped the team win a league championship.

Incheon Hyundai Steel Red Angels
On 18 March 2018, Nagano signed a one-year contract with Incheon Hyundai Steel Red Angels. On 23 April, she made her debut in a 0–0 draw with Gyeongju KHNP. On 1 June, she scored her first goal in a 7–1 home victory against Changnyeong.

Chifure AS Elfen Saitama
In January 2019, Nagano left South Korea and returned to her native Japan to play for Division 2 club Chifure AS Elfen Saitama. She stated that her motivation to join was because of her great respect for the coach of the team, Hiroshi Yoshida.

Mynavi Sendai
In January 2021, Nagano joined Mynavi Sendai.

North Carolina Courage
In July 2022, Nagano confirmed she would be joining the North Carolina Courage of the NWSL. She scored her first goal for the Courage on 20 August in a 4-0 victory over Chicago Red Stars.

Liverpool FC 
In January 2023, Nagano joined Liverpool FC. She was due to complete her debut on 22 January 2023 in a league match against Chelsea before the match was abandoned after 6 minutes of play.She made her official competitive debut in a 1-0 loss against West Ham United in the FA WSL Cup quarterfinals on 25 January 2023.

International career

Youth 
In 2016, Nagano competed at the All Japan Youth (U-15) Women's Championship. She was part of the under-16 team that won the 2013 AFC U-16 Women's Championship in China and of the under-17 team that won the 2014 FIFA U-17 Women's World Cup in Costa Rica. She captained Japan to the final of the 2016 FIFA U-17 Women's World Cup in Jordan, where they were defeated by North Korea on penalty kicks, and won the Golden Ball award as the tournament's top scorer.

In June 2018, Nagano was called up to the senior team for the first time for a friendly match against New Zealand.

In August 2018, Nagano was part of Japan's victorious team in the 2018 FIFA U-20 Women's World Cup in France, turning in a player of the match performance in the semi-final, and scoring a goal in the final in a 3-1 win over Spain.

Senior 
On 11 November 2018, Nagano debuted for senior team against Norway.

In 2022, now a regular in the Japan national team, she was part of the team that won the EAFF E-1 Football Championship in Japan.

Career statistics

Club

International

Scores and results list Japan's goal tally first, score column indicates score after each Nagano goal.

Honours
Urawa Red Diamonds
 Nadeshiko League: 2014
 Empress's Cup runner-up: 2014
 Nadeshiko League Cup runner-up: 2017
Incheon Hyundai Steel Red Angels

 WK League: 2018
Japan U17
 AFC U-16 Women's Championship: 2013
 FIFA U-17 Women's World Cup: 2014
Japan U20
 AFC U-19 Women's Championship: 2017
 FIFA U-20 Women's World Cup: 2018
Japan

 EAFF E-1 Football Championship: 2022

Individual
 FIFA U-17 Women's World Cup Golden Ball: 2016
 Asian Young Footballer of the Year: 2016

References

External links
 
 
 
 
Japan Football Association
 Fuka Nagano at Urawa Red Diamonds
 Fuka Nagano at Mynavi Sendai Ladies
 Fuka Nagano at Liverpool FC Women

1999 births
Living people
University of Tsukuba alumni
Association football people from Tokyo
Japanese women's footballers
Women's association football midfielders
Japan women's international footballers
Nadeshiko League players
Urawa Red Diamonds Ladies players
Chifure AS Elfen Saitama players
Mynavi Vegalta Sendai Ladies players
Asian Young Footballer of the Year winners
Incheon Hyundai Steel Red Angels WFC players
North Carolina Courage players
Liverpool F.C. Women players
WK League players
Japanese expatriate footballers
Expatriate women's footballers in South Korea
Japanese expatriate sportspeople in South Korea
WE League players
National Women's Soccer League players
Japanese expatriate sportspeople in England